John Hanson Kennard (1836 – May 2, 1887) was Judge of the Louisiana Supreme Court from December 3, 1872, to February 1, 1873.

Early life, education, and career
Born in Kent County, Maryland, he graduated from the University of Virginia in 1855, and from the Law Department of the University of Louisiana (now Tulane University) in 1857. He served in the Confederate Army during the American Civil War, in Fenner's Battery and the Louisiana Artillery, and resumed the practice of law in New Orleans in 1865. He also had an interest in a large-scale cotton planting operation.
 
Judge John Hanson Kennard was also a lineal descendant of founding father John Hanson, who act as 1st President of the Confederation Congress.

Judicial service and later life
In November 1872, Governor Henry C. Warmoth appointed Kennard to a seat as an associate justice of the Supreme Court of Louisiana, and Kennard "filled the place with assiduity and distinction for about three months," after which he "was displaced by an adverse decision as to the title of his office arising from the political complications of that period". Kennard sued for his right to hold the office, "ending at the U.S. Supreme Court where he lost to [Louisiana] Supreme Court Associate Justice Philip H. Morgan", who then assumed the office.

Kennard then returned to practice as a member of the law firm of Kennard, Howe & Prentiss, and was prominent in the Chamber of Commerce and in political matters. He served for a time as President of the Board of Directors of the University of Louisiana.

A few days before his death, he presided over a meeting of the alumni of his alma mater marking the birthday of Thomas Jefferson, and seemed to be in good health. However, "the exertion of the occasion seemed to annoy and worry him in such a manner as to excite some apprehension among his more intimate friends". On the evening of his death, in New Orleans, "paralysis of the brain manifested itself", and he died about an hour later.

Kennard was married twice, his first wife was Helen Wakefield Yale, being the granddaughter of a noted Judge McGee, of Wilkinson County, Mississippi. His second wife survived him, as did two sons and two daughters. Kennard was interred at Metairie Cemetery.

References

1836 births
1887 deaths
People from Kent County, Maryland
University of Virginia alumni
Tulane University Law School alumni
Justices of the Louisiana Supreme Court
19th-century American judges